Hexametra boddaertii is a parasitic roundworm belonging to the family Ascarididae. H. boddaertii was originally described from a single specimen of Mastigodryas boddaerti, a South American colubrine snake.  Other neotropical colubrids identified as hosts to H. boddaertii include Oxyrhopus trigeminus, Philodryas patagoniensis, Spilotes pullatus, Trimorphodon biscutatus, Philodryas baroni, and Oxyrhopus guibei. It is thought that Hexametra may be the causative agent of ocular disease, diffuse unilateral subacute neuroretinitis, (DSUN), in Brazil.

References

Ascaridida
Nematodes described in 1860
Parasitic nematodes of vertebrates
Parasites of reptiles